The Disaster Management Act, 2005, (23 December 2005) No. 53 of 2005, was passed by the Rajya Sabha,  the upper house of the Parliament of India on 28 November, and  the Lok Sabha, the lower house of the Parliament, on 12 December 2005. It received the assent of  The President of India  on 23 December 2005. The Disaster Management Act, 2005 has 11 chapters and 79 sections. The Act extends to the whole of India. The Act  provides effective management of disasters and for matters connected there with or incidental thereto." The main focus of this act is to provide the people who are affected with disasters, their life back and helping them.

National Authority
The Act calls for  the  establishment of National Disaster Management Authority (NDMA), with the  Prime Minister of India as chairperson.   The NDMA  may have no more than  nine  members including  a   Vice-Chairperson. The tenure of the  members of the NDMA shall be five years.  The NDMA which was initially  established on 30 May 2005 by an executive order,  was  constituted under  Section-3(1) of the Disaster Management Act, on 27 September 2006.  The NDMA is  responsible  for "laying down the policies, plans and guidelines for disaster management"  and to ensure "timely and effective response to disaster".  Under section 6 of the Act it is responsible for laying  "down guidelines to be followed by the State Authorities in drawing up the State Plans".

National Executive Committee 
The Act under Section 8  enjoins the Central Government  to Constitute a  National  Executive  Committee  (NEC)  to assist the National Authority. The  NEC is composed of Secretary level officers  of the Government of India in the Ministries  of  home, agriculture, atomic energy, defence, drinking water supply, environment and forests, finance (expenditure), health, power, rural development, science and technology, space, telecommunication, urban development,  and water resources, with the Home secretary  serving as  the Chairperson, ex officio.  The Chief of the Integrated Defence Staff of the Chiefs of Staff Committee,  is an ex officio member of the NEC.  The NEC under section of the Act  is responsible for the  preparation of the National Disaster Management  Plan for the whole country  and to ensure  that it is "reviewed and updated annually".

State Disaster Management Authority 
All State Governments  are mandated under Section 14 of the act to establish a State Disaster Management Authority (SDMA).  The  SDMA  consists of  the Chief Minister of the State, who is the Chairperson,  and  no more than eight members appointed by the Chief Minister. 
State Executive Committee is responsible (Section 22) for drawing up the state disaster management plan, and implementing the National Plan. 
The SDMA is  mandated under section 28  to ensure  that  all the departments of the State  prepare disaster management plans as prescribed by the National  and State Authorities.

District Disaster Management Authority 
The Chairperson of District Disaster Management Authority (DDMA)  will be the  Collector or District Magistrate or Deputy Commissioner of the district. The elected representative of the area is member of the DDMA as an ex officio  co-Chairperson, (Section 25).

National Disaster Response Force (NDRF) 
The Section 44–45 of the Act provides for  constituting a National Disaster Response Force "for the purpose of specialist response to a threatening disaster situation or disaster" under a  Director General to be appointed by the Central Government. In September 2014 Kashmir-floods NDRF along with the armed forces played a vital role in rescuing the locals and tourists. On January 23, 2022 on the occasion of Netaji Subhas Chandra Bose 125th anniversary, National Disaster Response Force (NDRF), 8th battalion awarded for Subhash Chandra Bose Aapda Prabandhan Puraskar.

Other  Provisions 
Section 42 of the  Act calls for establishing a National Institute of Disaster Management.  Section 46-50,  mandates  funds for Disaster Mitigation at various levels. The Act provides for civil and criminal liabilities for those who violate the provision of the Act.

Implementation 
The implementation of the National Disaster Act, 2005  has been slow, and slack. On 22 July 2013 Indian Supreme Court Justices A K Patnaik and M Y Eqbal in response to a Public Interest Litigation issued notices to the Governments of Uttarakhand, Tamil Nadu, Odisha, Andhra Pradesh, Gujarat, Rajasthan, Maharashtra and the Central government for alleged failure to implement the Disaster Management Act, 2005. The   petitioner alleged that the non-implementation of the Disaster Management Act by the Government of Uttarakhand   endangered the lives of citizens. He sought "reasonable ex-gratia assistance on account of loss of life, damage to houses and for restoration of means of livelihood to victims of flash floods in Uttarakhand under the Disaster Management Act".

Criticism of the Act
The act has been criticized for marginalizing Non-governmental organizations (NGOs), elected local representatives, local communities and civic group;  and for fostering a hierarchical, bureaucratic, command and control, 'top down', approach that gives the central, state, and district  authorities sweeping powers. It is also alleged that the "Act became a law almost at the will of the bureaucrats who framed it."

References

External links 
 Disaster Management in India

Emergency management in India
Acts of the Parliament of India 2005